Solar power in Switzerland has been growing rapidly in recent years due to declining system costs and a feed-in tariff instituted by the Swiss government. In 2013, cumulative capacity increased by 69% to 730 megawatts (MW) and contributed 544 GWh or 0.8% of the countries net-electricity production.

In 2014, another 320 megawatts were added bringing total installations to 1,076 MW and giving rise to Switzerland entering the group of currently twenty countries with a solar gigawatt market. As per the IEA-PVPS's calculations, the installed capacity by the end of 2014 should be enough to generate close to 2% of the domestic electricity demand—a significant increase compared to the 0.8% contributed by solar in 2013 (see charts below).

Historically, Switzerland had been a pioneer in solar photovoltaics in the 1980s and early 1990s but has since lost touch with the rapid-paced roll-out of solar by its world-leading southern and northern neighbors, Italy and Germany. However, the capped capacities that were put into place to avoid unregulated growth were raised in recent years as the surcharge on consumed electricity to pay for the feed-in tariff had been increased by the parliament. As the country is phasing-out nuclear power and the Swiss electricity sector is about to become completely liberalized, the electricity market is currently undergoing its largest change in history.

2019 Switzerland announced plans of large-scale solar auctions.

Domestic feed-in tariffs 

The federal government adopted feed-in tariffs to offer a cost-based compensation to renewable energy producers. The feed-in remuneration at cost (KEV) is the primary instrument for promoting the deployment of power systems using renewable energy sources.

It covers the difference between the production and the market price, and guarantees producers of electricity from renewable sources  a price that corresponds to their production costs. The following renewable energy sources are supported by the KEV remuneration: distributed small hydro (with capacities up to 10 MW), solar photovoltaics, wind power, geothermal energy, biomass and biogas (from agriculture, waste and water treatment).

The KEV remuneration is financed by collecting a surcharge on the consumed kilowatt-hour (kWh) of electricity. As in other countries, industries with a large electricity consumption are exempt from the surcharge, which has gradually been increased and stands at 1.5 cents per kWh as of 2014.

The remuneration tariffs for renewables have been specified based on reference power plants for each individual technology. Feed-in tariffs are applicable for 20 to 25 years, depending on the technology. For solar PV, the time-span was reduced from 25 to 20 years in 2014. In view of the anticipated technological progress and the increasing degree of market maturity of renewables energy technologies (especially for solar PV), the feed-in tariffs are subjected to a gradual reduction twice a year. These reductions only apply to new production facilities that are put into operation.

Planned installations of renewable power facilities have to be registered with Swissgrid, the national network operator. As of the end of 2014, a growing waiting list for solar photovoltaic systems has accumulated as demand exceeds the capped capacities given by the currently available funds of the KEV remuneration.

Statistics

References 

 
Energy in Switzerland